UBS is a bank and financial services company headquartered in Zurich, Switzerland.

UBS or Ubs may also refer to:
 Union Bank of Switzerland, the predecessor of UBS, prior to its merger with Swiss Bank Corporation
 UBS machine gun, a variant of the Berezin UB  machine gun
 UBS tax evasion controversy, alleged multibillion-dollar tax evasion case involving UBS
 Ulaanbaatar Broadcasting System, a national television channel in Mongolia
 Umeå Business School, Umeå University, Sweden
 Universal basic skills, secondary education
 Universal basic services, a form of social security
 Universal Business School, Karjat, Mumbai, India
 Unbundled Bitstream Service, a broadband Internet service in New Zealand
 Union Biblical Seminary, theological seminary in Pune, India
 Union Broadcasting System, a fictional television network in the 1976 film Network
 United Belgian States, a confederation in the southern Netherlands in 1790
 United Bible Societies, a global association of Bible publishers
 United Blood Services, a non-profit blood services organization in the western United States
 United Building Society, the name of several financial institutions in various countries
 Ultrasonic Broadcasting System, a Philippines radio network
 Unbiseptium, a hypothetical chemical element with symbol Ubs
 The Great Seljuks: Guardians of Justice, a Turkish television series, also known as Uyanış: Büyük Selçuklu (UBS)

See also
 USB (disambiguation)